Campeonato Paulista Segunda Divisão, also known as Campeonato Paulista Série B1, is the fourth level of the São Paulo state professional football tournaments that determines one of the several Brazilian states championships. The two best teams are promoted to Série A3.

List of champions 

There are all the championship editions, officially recognized by Federação Paulista de Futebol.

Federations

Amateur Era (1928-1931)

APEA - Associação Paulista de Esportes Atléticos

Professional Era (1960-)

FPF - Federação Paulista de Futebol

Titles by club 

Names change

Pão de Açúcar EC is the currently Grêmio Audax.
Oeste Paulista EC is the currently Grêmio Prudente.

Cities change

Oeste FC has moved from Itápolis to Barueri.
Grêmio Audax has moved from São Paulo to Osasco.
Red Bull Brasil has moved from Campinas to Bragança Paulista, due to the partnership between Red Bull and CA Bragantino (Red Bull Bragantino). Red Bull Brasil became the B team.

See also
Campeonato Paulista
Campeonato Paulista Série A2
Campeonato Paulista Série A3
Campeonato Paulista Série B2
Campeonato Paulista Série B3
Federação Paulista de Futebol

References

External links
League on Soccerway.com
RSSSF

4